Slapylitidae is a family of hyolithid hyoliths known from articulated skeletons lacking helens. The two included genera, Slapylites and Nevadalites , are found in the mid-Cambrian, particularly of the Barrundian area; a possible additional representative in the open systematic nomenclature may extend the range of the genus to the Devonian.

References

Hyolitha